

Events

Pre-1600
1056 – After a sudden illness a few days previously, Byzantine Empress Theodora dies childless, thus ending the Macedonian dynasty.
1057 – Abdication of Byzantine Emperor Michael VI Bringas after just one year.
1218 – Al-Kamil becomes sultan of the Ayyubid dynasty.
1314 – King Haakon V of Norway moves the capital from Bergen to Oslo.
1422 – King Henry V of England dies of dysentery while in France. His son, Henry VI becomes King of England at the age of nine months.
1535 – Pope Paul III excommunicates English King Henry VIII from the church. He drew up a papal bull of excommunication which began Eius qui immobilis.

1601–1900
1776 – William Livingston, the first Governor of New Jersey, begins serving his first term.
1795 – War of the First Coalition: The British capture Trincomalee (present-day Sri Lanka) from the Dutch in order to keep it out of French hands.
1798 – Irish Rebellion: Irish rebels, with French assistance, establish the short-lived Republic of Connacht.
1813 – Peninsular War: Spanish troops repel a French attack in the Battle of San Marcial.
1864 – During the American Civil War, Union forces led by General William T. Sherman launch an assault on Atlanta.
1876 – Ottoman Sultan Murad V is deposed and succeeded by his brother Abdul Hamid II.
1886 – The 7.0  Charleston earthquake affects southeastern South Carolina with a maximum Mercalli intensity of X (Extreme). Sixty people killed with damage estimated at $5–6 million.
1888 – Mary Ann Nichols is murdered. She is the first of Jack the Ripper's confirmed victims.
1895 – German Count Ferdinand von Zeppelin patents his navigable balloon.

1901–present
1907 – Russia and the United Kingdom sign the Anglo-Russian Convention, by which the UK recognizes Russian preeminence in northern Persia, while Russia recognizes British preeminence in southeastern Persia and Afghanistan. Both powers pledge not to interfere in Tibet.
1918 – World War I: Start of the Battle of Mont Saint-Quentin, a successful assault by the Australian Corps during the Hundred Days Offensive.
1920 – Polish–Soviet War: A decisive Polish victory in the Battle of Komarów.
1933 – The Integral Nationalist Group wins the 1933 Andorran parliamentary election, the first election in Andorra held with universal male suffrage.
1935 – In an attempt to stay out of the growing tensions concerning Germany and Japan, the United States passes the first of its Neutrality Acts.
1936 – Radio Prague, now the official international broadcasting station of the Czech Republic, goes on the air.
1939 – Nazi Germany mounts a false flag attack on the Gleiwitz radio station, creating an excuse to attack Poland the following day, thus starting World War II in Europe.
1940 – Pennsylvania Central Airlines Trip 19 crashes near Lovettsville, Virginia. The CAB investigation of the accident is the first investigation to be conducted under the Bureau of Air Commerce act of 1938.
1941 – World War II: Serbian paramilitary forces defeat Germans in the Battle of Loznica.
1943 – , the first U.S. Navy ship to be named after a black person, is commissioned.
1949 – The retreat of the Democratic Army of Greece into Albania after its defeat on Gramos mountain marks the end of the Greek Civil War.
1950 – TWA Flight 903 crashes near Itay El Barud, Egypt, killing all 55 aboard.
1957 – The Federation of Malaya (now Malaysia) gains its independence from the United Kingdom.
1959 – A parcel bomb sent by Ngô Đình Nhu, younger brother and chief adviser of South Vietnamese President Ngô Đình Diệm, fails to kill King Norodom Sihanouk of Cambodia.
1962 – Trinidad and Tobago becomes independent.
1963 – Crown Colony of North Borneo (now Sabah) achieves self governance.
1972 – Aeroflot Flight 558 crashes in the Abzelilovsky District in Bashkortostan, Russia (then the Soviet Union), killing all 102 people aboard.
1986 – Aeroméxico Flight 498 collides with a Piper PA-28 Cherokee over Cerritos, California, killing 67 in the air and 15 on the ground.
  1986   – The Soviet passenger liner  sinks in the Black Sea after colliding with the bulk carrier Pyotr Vasev, killing 423.
1987 – Thai Airways Flight 365 crashes into the ocean near Ko Phuket, Thailand, killing all 83 aboard.
1988 – Delta Air Lines Flight 1141 crashes during takeoff from Dallas/Fort Worth International Airport, killing 14.
  1988   – CAAC Flight 301 overshoots the runway at Kai Tak Airport and crashes into Kowloon Bay, killing seven people.
1991 – Kyrgyzstan declares its independence from the Soviet Union.
1993 – Russia completes removing its troops from Lithuania.
1994 – Russia completes removing its troops from Estonia.
1996 – Saddam Hussein's troops seized Irbil after the Kurdish Masoud Barzani appealed for help to defeat his Kurdish rival PUK.
1997 – Diana, Princess of Wales, her partner Dodi Fayed and driver Henri Paul die in a car crash in Paris.
1999 – The first of a series of bombings in Moscow kills one person and wounds 40 others.
  1999   – A LAPA Boeing 737-200 crashes during takeoff from Jorge Newbury Airport in Buenos Aires, killing 65, including two on the ground.
2002 – Typhoon Rusa, the most powerful typhoon to hit South Korea in 43 years, made landfall, killing at least 236 people.
2005 – The 2005 Al-Aaimmah bridge stampede in Baghdad kills 953 people.
2006 – Edvard Munch's famous painting The Scream, stolen on August 22, 2004, is recovered in a raid by Norwegian police.
2016 – Brazil's President Dilma Rousseff is impeached and removed from office.

Births

Pre-1600
12 – Caligula, Roman emperor (d. 41)
 161 – Commodus, Roman emperor (d. 192)
1018 – Jeongjong II, Korean ruler (d. 1046)
1168 – Zhang Zong, Chinese emperor (d. 1208)
1542 – Isabella de' Medici, Italian princess (d. 1576)
1569 – Jahangir, Mughal emperor (d. 1627)

1601–1900
1652 – Ferdinando Carlo Gonzaga, Italian nobleman (d. 1708)
1663 – Guillaume Amontons, French physicist and instrument maker (d. 1705)
1721 – George Hervey, 2nd Earl of Bristol, English soldier and politician, Lord Lieutenant of Ireland (d. 1775)
1741 – Jean-Paul-Égide Martini, French composer and educator (d. 1816)
1748 – Jean-Étienne Despréaux, French ballet dancer, choreographer, composer, and playwright (d. 1820)
1767 – Henry Joy McCracken, Irish businessman and activist, founded the Society of United Irishmen (d. 1798)
1775 – Agnes Bulmer, English poet and author (d. 1836)
1797 – Stephen Geary, English architect, inventor and entrepreneur (d. 1854)
1802 – Husein Gradaščević, Ottoman general (d. 1834)
1821 – Hermann von Helmholtz, German physician and physicist (d. 1894)
1823 – Galusha A. Grow, American lawyer and politician, 28th Speaker of the United States House of Representatives (d. 1907)
1834 – Amilcare Ponchielli, Italian composer and educator (d. 1886)
1842 – Josephine St. Pierre Ruffin, American journalist, publisher, and activist (d. 1924)
1843 – Georg von Hertling, German academic and politician, 7th Chancellor of the German Empire (d. 1919)
1870 – Maria Montessori, Italian physician and educator (d. 1952)
1871 – James E. Ferguson, American banker and politician, 26th Governor of Texas (d. 1944)
1878 – Frank Jarvis, American sprinter and lawyer (d. 1933)
1879 – Alma Mahler, Austrian-American composer and author (d. 1964)
  1879   – Taishō, emperor of Japan (d. 1926)
1880 – Wilhelmina, queen of the Netherlands (d. 1962)
1884 – George Sarton, Belgian-American historian of science (d. 1956)
1885 – DuBose Heyward, American author and playwright (d. 1940)
1890 – August Alle, Estonian poet and author (d. 1952)
  1890   – Nätti-Jussi, Finnish lumberjack and forest laborer (d. 1964)
1893 – Lily Laskine, French harp player (d. 1988)
1894 – Albert Facey, Australian soldier and author (d. 1982)
1896 – Brian Edmund Baker, English Air Marshal (d. 1979)
  1896   – Félix-Antoine Savard, Canadian priest and author (d. 1982)
1897 – Fredric March, American actor (d. 1975)
1900 – Gino Lucetti, Italian anarchist, attempted assassin of Benito Mussolini (d. 1943)

1901–present
1902 – Géza Révész, Hungarian general and politician, Hungarian Minister of Defence (d. 1977)
1903 – Arthur Godfrey, American radio and television host (d. 1983)
  1903   – Vladimir Jankélévitch, French musicologist and philosopher (d. 1985)
1905 – Robert Bacher, American physicist and academic (d. 2004)
  1905   – Sanford Meisner, American actor and educator (d. 1997)
1907 – Valter Biiber, Estonian footballer (d. 1977)
  1907   – Augustus F. Hawkins, American lawyer and politician (d. 2007)
  1907   – Ramon Magsaysay, Filipino captain, engineer, and politician, 7th President of the Philippines (d. 1957)
  1907   – William Shawn, American journalist (d. 1992)
  1907   – Altiero Spinelli, Italian theorist and politician (d. 1986)
1908 – William Saroyan, American novelist, playwright, and short story writer (d. 1981)
1909 – Ferenc Fejtő,  Hungarian-French journalist and political scientist (d. 2008)
1911 – Edward Brongersma, Dutch journalist and politician (d. 1998)
  1911   – Arsenio Rodríguez, Cuban-American tres player, composer, and bandleader (d. 1970)
1913 – Helen Levitt, American photographer and cinematographer (d. 2009)
  1913   – Bernard Lovell, English physicist and astronomer (d. 2012)
1914 – Richard Basehart, American actor (d. 1984)
1915 – Pete Newell, American basketball player and coach (d. 2008)
1916 – Danny Litwhiler, American baseball player and coach (d. 2011)
  1916   – Daniel Schorr, American journalist and author (d. 2010)
  1916   – John S. Wold, American geologist and politician (d. 2017)
1918 – Alan Jay Lerner, American songwriter and composer (d. 1986)
1919 – Amrita Pritam, Indian poet and author (d. 2005)
1921 – Otis G. Pike, American judge and politician (d. 2014)
  1921   – Raymond Williams, Welsh author and academic (d. 1988)
1924 – John Davidson, American physician and politician (d. 2012)
  1924   – Buddy Hackett, American actor and singer (d. 2003)
  1924   – Herbert Wise, Austrian-English director and producer (d. 2015)
1925 – Moran Campbell, English-Canadian physician and academic, invented the venturi mask (d. 2004)
  1925   – Maurice Pialat, French actor and director (d. 2003)
1928 – James Coburn, American actor (d. 2002)
  1928   – Jaime Sin, Filipino cardinal (d. 2005)
1930 – Big Tiny Little, American pianist (d. 2010)
1931 – Jean Béliveau, Canadian ice hockey player (d. 2014)
  1931   – Noble Willingham, American actor (d. 2004)
1932 – Allan Fotheringham, Canadian journalist (d. 2020)
  1932   – Roy Castle, English dancer, singer, comedian, actor, television presenter and musician (d. 1994)
1935 – Eldridge Cleaver, American activist and author (d. 1998)
  1935   – Bryan Organ, English painter
  1935   – Frank Robinson, American baseball player and manager (d. 2019)
1936 – Vladimir Orlov, Russian journalist and author (d. 2014)
1937 – Warren Berlinger, American actor
  1937   – Bobby Parker, American singer-songwriter and guitarist (d. 2013)
1938 – Martin Bell, English journalist and politician
1939 – Jerry Allison, American drummer and songwriter (d. 2022)
1940 – Robbie Basho, American guitarist, pianist, and composer (d. 1986)
  1940   – Wilton Felder, American saxophonist and bass player (d. 2015)
  1940   – Larry Hankin, American actor, director, and producer
  1940   – Roger Newman, English-American actor and screenwriter (d. 2010)
  1940   – Jack Thompson, Australian actor
1941 – William DeWitt, Jr., American businessman
  1941   – Emmanuel Nunes, Portuguese-French composer and educator (d. 2012)
1942 – Isao Aoki, Japanese golfer
1943 – Leonid Ivashov, Russian general
1944 – Roger Dean, English illustrator and publisher
  1944   – Liz Forgan, English journalist
  1944   – Christine King, English historian and academic
  1944   – Clive Lloyd, Guyanese cricketer
1945 – Van Morrison, Northern Irish singer-songwriter
  1945   – Itzhak Perlman, Israeli-American violinist and conductor
  1945   – Bob Welch, American singer and guitarist (d. 2012)
1946 – Ann Coffey, Scottish social worker and politician
  1946   – Jerome Corsi, American conspiracy theorist and author
  1946   – Tom Coughlin, American football player and coach
1947 – Luca Cordero di Montezemolo, Italian businessman
  1947   – Yumiko Ōshima, Japanese author and illustrator
  1947   – Somchai Wongsawat, Thai lawyer and politician, 26th Prime Minister of Thailand
1948 – Harald Ertl, Austrian race car driver and journalist (d. 1982)
  1948   – Lowell Ganz, American screenwriter and producer
  1948   – Ken McMullen, English director, producer, and screenwriter
  1948   – Holger Osieck, German footballer and manager
  1948   – Rudolf Schenker, German guitarist and songwriter
1949 – Richard Gere, American actor and producer
  1949   – Hugh David Politzer, American physicist and academic, Nobel Prize laureate
  1949   – Rick Roberts, American country-rock singer-songwriter and guitarist
1951 – Grant Batty, New Zealand rugby player
  1951   – Sirje Tamul, Estonian historian, author, and academic
1952 – Kim Kashkashian, American viola player and educator
  1952   – Herbert Reul, German politician
1953 – Miguel Ángel Guerra, Argentinian race car driver
  1953   – György Károly, Hungarian poet and author (d. 2018)
  1953   – Pavel Vinogradov, Russian astronaut and engineer
1954 – Julie Brown, American actress and screenwriter
1955 – Aleksander Krupa, Polish-American actor
  1955   – Julie Maxton, Scottish lawyer and academic
  1955   – Edwin Moses, American hurdler
  1955   – Anthony Thistlethwaite, English saxophonist and bass player
  1955   – Gary Webb, American journalist and author (d. 2004)
1956 – Mária Balážová, Slovak painter and illustrator
  1956   – Masashi Tashiro, Japanese singer, actor, and director
  1956   – Tsai Ing-wen, Taiwanese politician and the President of the Republic of China
1957 – Colm O'Rourke, Irish footballer and sportscaster
  1957   – Gina Schock, American drummer
  1957   – Glenn Tilbrook, English singer-songwriter and guitarist
1958 – Serge Blanco, Venezuelan-French rugby player and businessman
  1958   – Stephen Cottrell, English bishop
1959 – Ralph Krueger, Canadian ice hockey player and coach
  1959   – Jessica Upshaw, American lawyer and politician (d. 2013)
1960 – Vali Ionescu, Romanian long jumper
  1960   – Chris Whitley, American singer-songwriter and guitarist (d. 2005)
  1960   – Hassan Nasrallah, Lebanese politician, 3rd Secretary-General of Hezbollah
1961 – Kieran Crowley, New Zealand rugby player
  1961   – Magnus Ilmjärv, Estonian historian and author
1962 – Dee Bradley Baker, American voice actor
1963 – Reb Beach, American guitarist
  1963   – Rituparno Ghosh, Indian actor, director, and screenwriter (d. 2013)
  1963   – Sonny Silooy, Dutch footballer and manager
1964 – Raymond P. Hammond, American poet and critic
1965 – Zsolt Borkai, Hungarian gymnast and politician
  1965   – Susan Gritton, English soprano and actress
1966 – Lyuboslav Penev, Bulgarian footballer and manager
1967 – Gene Hoglan, American drummer
  1967   – Anita Moen, Norwegian skier
1968 – Valdon Dowiyogo, Nauruan politician (d. 2016)
  1968   – Hideo Nomo, Japanese-American baseball player
  1968   – Jolene Watanabe, American tennis player (d. 2019)
1969 – Nathalie Bouvier, French skier
  1969   – Jonathan LaPaglia, Australian actor and physician
  1969   – Javagal Srinath, Indian cricketer and referee
1970 – Debbie Gibson, American singer-songwriter, producer, and actress
  1970   – Nikola Gruevski, Macedonian economist and politician, 6th Prime Minister of the Republic of Macedonia
  1970   – Greg Mulholland, English politician
  1970   – Queen Rania of Jordan
  1970   – Arie van Lent, Dutch-German footballer and manager
  1970   – Zack Ward, Canadian actor and producer
1971 – Kirstie Allsopp, British TV presenter
  1971   – Pádraig Harrington, Irish golfer
  1971   – Vadim Repin, Belgian-Russian violinist
  1971   – Chris Tucker, American comedian and actor
1973 – Scott Niedermayer, Canadian ice hockey player and coach
1974 – Andriy Medvedev, Ukrainian-Monégasque tennis player
1975 – Craig Cumming, New Zealand cricketer and sportscaster
  1975   – John Grahame, American ice hockey player and coach
  1975   – Sara Ramirez, Mexican musician
1976 – Vincent Delerm, French singer-songwriter and pianist
  1976   – Roque Júnior, Brazilian footballer and manager
  1976   – Radek Martínek, Czech ice hockey player
1977 – Jeff Hardy, American wrestler and singer
  1977   – Ian Harte, Irish footballer
  1977   – Craig Nicholls, Australian singer-songwriter and guitarist
  1977   – Arzu Yanardağ, Turkish actress and model
1978 – Philippe Christanval, French footballer
  1978   – Ido Pariente, Israeli mixed martial artist and trainer
  1978   – Craig Stapleton, Australian rugby league player
  1978   – Sandis Valters, Latvian basketball player
  1978   – Morten Qvenild, Norwegian pianist and composer
1979 – Clay Hensley, American baseball player
  1979   – Mark Johnston, Canadian swimmer
  1979   – Simon Neil, Scottish singer-songwriter, guitarist, and producer
  1979   – Yuvan Shankar Raja, Indian Tamil singer-songwriter and producer
  1979   – Ramón Santiago, Dominican baseball player
  1979   – Mickie James, American wrestler
1980 – Joe Budden, American rapper
1981 – Ahmad Al Harthy, Omani race car driver
  1981   – Dwayne Peel, Welsh rugby player
  1981   – Steve Saviano, American ice hockey player
1982 – Ian Crocker, American swimmer
  1982   – Chris Duhon, American basketball player
  1982   – Lien Huyghebaert, Belgian sprinter
  1982   – Christopher Katongo, Zambian footballer
  1982   – Josh Kroeger, American baseball player
  1982   – Alexei Mikhnov, Ukrainian-Russian ice hockey player
  1982   – Pepe Reina, Spanish footballer
  1982   – Michele Rugolo, Italian race car driver
  1982   – G. Willow Wilson, American journalist and author
1983 – Deniz Aydoğdu, German-Turkish footballer
  1983   – Milan Biševac, Serbian footballer
  1983   – Larry Fitzgerald, American football player
1984 – Matti Breschel, Danish cyclist
  1984   – Ryan Kesler, American ice hockey player
  1984   – Ted Ligety, American skier
  1984   – Charl Schwartzel, South African golfer
1985 – Rolando, Portuguese footballer
  1985   – Andrew Foster, Australian footballer
  1985   – Mabel Matiz, Turkish singer
  1985   – Mohammed bin Salman, Crown Prince of Saudi Arabia
1987 – Xavi Annunziata, Spanish footballer
  1987   – Petros Kravaritis, Greek footballer
  1987   – Ondřej Pavelec, Czech ice hockey player
1988 – Trent Hodkinson, Australian rugby league player
  1988   – David Ospina, Colombian footballer
  1988   – Ember Moon, Professional Wrestler
1989 – Dezmon Briscoe, American football player
1990 – Tadeja Majerič, Slovenian tennis player
1991 – António Félix da Costa, Portuguese race car driver
  1991   – Cédric Soares, Portuguese footballer
1992 – Holly Earl, British actress
  1992   – Tyler Randell, Australian rugby league player
1993 – Pablo Marí, Spanish football player
  1993   – Ilnur Alshin, Russian football player
  1993   – Anna Karnaukh, Russian water polo player
1994 – Alex Harris, Scottish footballer
  1994   – Can Aktav, Turkish football player
2001 – Amanda Anisimova, American tennis player
2004 – Jang Won-young, South Korean singer and model

Deaths

Pre-1600
 318 – Liu Cong, emperor of the Xiongnu state
 577 – John Scholasticus, Byzantine patriarch and saint
 651 – Aidan of Lindisfarne, Irish bishop and saint
 731 – Ōtomo no Tabito, Japanese poet (b. 665)
 894 – Ahmad ibn Muhammad al-Ta'i, Muslim governor
1054 – Kunigunde of Altdorf, Frankish noblewoman (b. c. 1020)
1056 – Theodora, Empress of the Eastern Roman Empire (b. 981)
1158 – Sancho III of Castile (b. 1134)
1234 – Emperor Go-Horikawa of Japan (b. 1212)
1287 – Konrad von Würzburg, German poet
1324 – Henry II of Jerusalem (b. 1271)
1372 – Ralph de Stafford, 1st Earl of Stafford, English soldier (b. 1301)
1422 – Henry V of England (b. 1386)
1450 – Isabella of Navarre, Countess of Armagnac (b. 1395)
1502 – Thomas Wode, Lord Chief Justice of the Common Pleas
1528 – Matthias Grünewald, German artist (b. 1470)

1601–1900
1645 – Francesco Bracciolini, Italian poet (b. 1566)
1654 – Ole Worm, Danish physician and historian (b. 1588)
1688 – John Bunyan, English preacher, theologian, and author (b. 1628)
1730 – Gottfried Finger, Czech-German viol player and composer (b. 1660)
1741 – Johann Gottlieb Heineccius, German academic and jurist (b. 1681)
1772 – William Borlase, English geologist and historian (b. 1695)
1795 – François-André Danican Philidor, French-English chess player and composer (b. 1726)
1799 – Nicolas-Henri Jardin, French architect and academic, designed the Bernstorff Palace and Marienlyst Castle (b. 1720)
1811 – Louis Antoine de Bougainville, French admiral and explorer (b. 1729)
1814 – Arthur Phillip, English admiral and politician, 1st Governor of New South Wales (b. 1738)
1817 – Sir John Duckworth, 1st Baronet, English admiral and politician, 39th Commodore Governor of Newfoundland (b. 1747)
1818 – Robert Calder, Scottish admiral (b. 1745)
1858 – Chief Oshkosh, Menominee chief (b. 1795)
1867 – Charles Baudelaire, French poet and critic (b. 1821)
1869 – Mary Ward, Irish astronomer and entomologist (b. 1827)
1884 – Robert Torrens, Irish-Australian politician, 3rd Premier of South Australia (b. 1814)

1901–present
1908 – Leslie Green, English architect (b. 1875)
1910 – Emīls Dārziņš, Latvian composer, conductor, and music critic (b. 1875)
1912 – Jean, duc Decazes, French sailor (b. 1864)
1920 – Wilhelm Wundt, German physician, psychologist, and philosopher (b. 1832)
1924 – Todor Aleksandrov, Bulgarian soldier (b. 1881)
1927 – Andranik, Armenian general (b. 1865)
1937 – Ruth Baldwin, British socialite (b. 1905)
1940 – Georges Gauthier, Canadian archbishop (b. 1871)
1941 – Thomas Bavin, New Zealand-Australian politician, 24th Premier of New South Wales (b. 1874)
  1941   – Marina Tsvetaeva, Russian poet and author (b. 1892)
1948 – Andrei Zhdanov, Russian civil servant and politician (b. 1896)
1951 – Paul Demel, Czech actor (b. 1903)
1952 – Henri Bourassa, Canadian publisher and politician (b. 1868)
1954 – Elsa Barker, American author and poet (b. 1869)
1963 – Georges Braque, French painter and sculptor (b. 1882)
1965 – E. E. Smith, American engineer and author (b. 1890)
1967 – Ilya Ehrenburg, Russian journalist and author (b. 1891)
1968 – John Hartle, English motorcycle racer (b. 1933)
1969 – Rocky Marciano, American boxer (b. 1923)
1973 – John Ford, American actor, director, producer, and screenwriter (b. 1894)
1974 – William Pershing Benedict, American soldier and pilot (b. 1918)
  1974   – Norman Kirk, New Zealand engineer and politician, 29th Prime Minister of New Zealand (b. 1923)
1978 – John Wrathall, Rhodesian accountant and politician, 2nd President of Rhodesia (b. 1913)
1979 – Sally Rand, American actress and dancer (b. 1904)
  1979   – Tiger Smith, English cricketer and coach (b. 1886)
1984 – Audrey Wagner, American baseball player, obstetrician, and gynecologist (b. 1927)
1985 – Frank Macfarlane Burnet, Australian virologist and academic, Nobel Prize laureate (b. 1899)
1986 – Elizabeth Coatsworth, American author and poet (b. 1893)
  1986   – Urho Kekkonen, Finnish journalist, lawyer, and politician, 8th President of Finland (b. 1900)
  1986   – Henry Moore, English sculptor and illustrator (b. 1898)
1990 – Nathaniel Clifton, American basketball player and coach (b. 1922)
1991 – Cliff Lumsdon, Canadian swimmer and coach (b. 1931)
1997 – Diana, Princess of Wales (b. 1961)
  1997   – Dodi Fayed, Egyptian film producer (b. 1955)
2000 – Lucille Fletcher, American screenwriter (b. 1912)
  2000   – Dolores Moore, American baseball player and educator (b. 1932)
2002 – Lionel Hampton, American pianist, composer, and bandleader (b. 1908)
  2002   – Farhad Mehrad, Persian singer-songwriter, guitarist, and pianist (b. 1944)
  2002   – George Porter, English chemist and academic, Nobel Prize laureate (b. 1920)
2005 – Joseph Rotblat, Polish-English physicist and academic, Nobel Prize laureate (b. 1908)
2006 – Mohamed Abdelwahab, Egyptian footballer (b. 1983)
  2006   – Tom Delaney, English race car driver and businessman (b. 1911)
2007 – Gay Brewer, American golfer (b. 1932)
  2007   – Jean Jacques Paradis, Canadian general (b. 1928)
  2007   – Sulev Vahtre, Estonian historian and academic (b. 1926)
2008 – Ken Campbell, English actor and screenwriter (b. 1941)
  2008   – Ike Pappas, American journalist (b. 1933)
  2008   – Victor Yates, New Zealand rugby player (b. 1939)
2010 – Laurent Fignon, French cyclist (b. 1960)
2011 – Wade Belak, Canadian ice hockey player (b. 1976)
2012 – Max Bygraves, English actor (b. 1922)
  2012   – Joe Lewis, American martial artist and actor (b. 1944)
  2012   – Carlo Maria Martini, Italian cardinal (b. 1927)
  2012   – Kashiram Rana, Indian lawyer and politician (b. 1938)
  2012   – John C. Shabaz, American judge and politician (b. 1931)
  2012   – Sergey Sokolov, Russian commander and politician, 6th Minister of Defence for The Soviet Union (b. 1911)
2013 – Alan Carrington, English chemist and academic (b. 1934)
  2013   – David Frost, English journalist and game show host (b. 1939)
  2013   – Jimmy Greenhalgh, English footballer and manager (b. 1923)
  2013   – Jan Camiel Willems, Belgian mathematician and theorist (b. 1939)
2014 – Bapu, Indian director and screenwriter (b. 1933)
  2014   – Ștefan Andrei, Romanian politician, 87th Romanian Minister of Foreign Affairs (b. 1931)
  2014   – Stan Goldberg, American illustrator (b. 1932)
  2014   – Carol Vadnais, Canadian ice hockey player and coach (b. 1945)
2015 – Edward Douglas-Scott-Montagu, 3rd Baron Montagu of Beaulieu, English politician, founded the National Motor Museum (b. 1926)
  2015   – Tom Scott, American football player (b. 1930)
2018 – Carole Shelley, British-American actress (b. 1939)
  2018   – Jennifer Ramírez Rivero, Venezuelan model and businesswoman (b. 1978)
2019 – Anthoine Hubert, French race car driver (b. 1996)
  2019   – Alec Holowka, Canadian game developer (b. 1983)
2020 – Pranab Mukherjee, Former President of India (b. 1935)
  2020   – Tom Seaver, American baseball player (b. 1944)
2021 – Mahal, Filipino comedian and actress (b. 1974)
  2021   – Francesco Morini, Italian footballer (b. 1944)
  2021   – Michael Constantine, Greek-American actor (b. 1927)
  2021   – Geronimo, British alpaca (b. 2013)

Holidays and observances
 Baloch-Pakhtun Unity Day (Balochs and Pashtuns, International observance)
 Christian feast day:
 Aidan of Lindisfarne
 Aristides of Athens
 Cuthburh
 Dominguito del Val
 Joseph of Arimathea
 Nicodemus
 Paulinus of Trier
 Raymond Nonnatus
 Wala of Corbie
 Waltheof, Earl of Northumbria
 August 31 (Eastern Orthodox liturgics)
 Day of Solidarity and Freedom (Poland)
 Independence Day, celebrates the independence of Kyrgyzstan from the Soviet Union in 1991.
 Independence Day, celebrates the independence of Malaya from the United Kingdom in 1957.
 Independence Day, celebrates the independence of Trinidad and Tobago from the United Kingdom in 1962.
 Romanian Language Day (Romania)
 Our Language (Moldova)
 North Borneo Self-government Day (Sabah, Borneo)

References

External links

 
 
 

Days of the year
August